La apuesta (The Bet) is a 1968 Costa Rican film directed by Miguel Salaguero. It was one of only three fictional films made in Costa Rica between 1955 and 1970. The film was shot in 16mm and follows the dramatized story of a group of people who set out in Toyota Land Cruisers on what was then a long journey from San José, Costa Rica, to Limón on the east coast. The film was shot before the construction of Route 32, so the travelers pass along the old southern route through Turrialba, the railway line and the now abandoned via Carrillo.

References

1968 films
Costa Rican drama films
Films shot in 16 mm film